The National Observer (formerly known as Australia and World Affairs) was a quarterly current-affairs and politics magazine in Australia. It specialised in domestic and international politics, security-related challenges and issues of national cohesion.

History and profile
The magazine was founded in 1988. It was renamed as National Observer in 1999. It was published on a quarterly basis and was part of the Council for the National Interest. The magazine was headquartered in Melbourne. Contributors to National Observer included many right-wing commentators from both Australia and overseas, including Tony Abbott, Nick Minchin, Patrick J. Buchanan, Bill Hayden, David Flint, B.A. Santamaria, Mark Steyn, Paul Gottfried, Hugh Morgan, Kenneth Minogue, John Stone, Hal G. P. Colebatch, Max Teichmann, R. J. Stove, Geoffrey Partington, Melvin J. Lasky, Kevin B. MacDonald, and Brian Crozier.

Until 2005 the magazine was edited by Ian Spry; from 2005 until early 2010 Philip Ayres edited it. During Ayres's editorship, the magazine ceased to appear in print form in Autumn 2009. It moved to an exclusively web-based format. John Ballantyne was the editor of the online magazine, which ceased publication completely in 2012.

References

External links
National Observer website
 National Library of Australia entry for National Observer

1988 establishments in Australia
2012 disestablishments in Australia
Defunct political magazines published in Australia
Magazines established in 1988
Magazines disestablished in 2009
Magazines published in Melbourne
News magazines published in Australia
Online magazines with defunct print editions
Quarterly magazines published in Australia